Hymns We Love is the first gospel album by Pat Boone. It was released in 1957 on Dot Records.

Track listing

References 

1957 albums
Pat Boone albums
Dot Records albums
Gospel albums by American artists